is a 2002 Japanese horror film directed by Hideo Nakata and written by Yoshihiro Nakamura and Kenichi Suzuki, based on the short story collection by Koji Suzuki. The film stars Hitomi Kuroki, Rio Kanno, Mirei Oguchi, Asami Mizukawa, Fumiyo Kohinata, Yu Tokui, Isao Yatsu and Shigemitsu Ogi. The plot follows a divorced mother who moves into a rundown apartment with her daughter, and experiences supernatural occurrences including a mysterious water leak from the floor above.

An American-produced remake of the film, directed by Walter Salles and starring Jennifer Connelly and Tim Roth, was released in 2005.

Plot 
Yoshimi Matsubara, in the midst of a divorce mediation, rents a run-down apartment with her daughter, Ikuko. She enrolls Ikuko in a nearby kindergarten and gets a job as a proofreader in a small publishing company. The ceiling of their apartment has a leak that worsens on a daily basis. Matsubara complains to the building superintendent but he does nothing to fix it. When she tries to contact the apartment above, she gets no answer.

Strange events recur: a red bag reappears no matter how often Yoshimi tries to dispose of it. Hair is found in tap water. Yoshimi gets glimpses of a mysterious long-haired girl around the complex. She becomes regularly late in picking up Ikuko from school and is stressed further when her ex-husband tries to take Ikuko. Several incidents remind her of the time she was abandoned as a child. When Ikuko sees the long-haired girl in a yellow raincoat, she becomes ill. Yoshimi discovers a flyer for a missing girl named Mitsuko Kawai, who had attended the same kindergarten as Ikuko but disappeared about a year ago. Mitsuko had worn a yellow raincoat and carried a red bag. Yoshimi discovers the apartment upstairs is Mitsuko's former apartment.

One day, Yoshimi finds Ikuko in the apartment upstairs, discovering that the faucets have been left running and have flooded the entire unit. Yoshimi decides to move out, but her lawyer convinces her that moving now would weaken her position in gaining custody of Ikuko. Her lawyer talks to the superintendent, who finally agrees to fix the issue. After the ceiling is patched, things seemingly return to normal. But Yoshimi finds that the red bag has reappeared. She heads to the building roof and notices that the water tank was last inspected – and thus opened – over a year ago: the same day Mitsuko was last reported seen. She comes to the horrific realization via a vision that Mitsuko had fallen into the tank while trying to retrieve her red bag and drowned. Meanwhile, her ghost attempts to drown Ikuko in the bathtub.

Yoshimi finds Ikuko unconscious. She grabs her and rushes into the elevator, fleeing from Mitsuko. But as the elevator door closes, she sees that the figure pursuing her is in fact her own daughter – she is actually carrying Mitsuko. Mitsuko claims Yoshimi as her mother in a torrent of water and Yoshimi realizes that she won't let her go. With Ikuko watching tearfully, Yoshimi sacrifices herself by staying in the elevator to appease Mitsuko's spirit. Ikuko rushes to the floor the elevator stops but when the doors open, a flood of brown water rushes out and nobody emerges.

Ten years later, Ikuko, now in high school, revisits the now-abandoned block and notices that her old apartment looks oddly clean and lived-in. She then sees her mother, looking exactly as she did that fateful night, and they have a conversation. Yoshimi affirms that as long as Ikuko is all right, she is happy. Ikuko pleads to live with her mother but she apologizes that they cannot be together. Mitsuko appears behind Ikuko. Ikuko turns but sees no one. When she turns back around, Yoshimi has also disappeared. Ikuko realizes that her mother's spirit has been watching over her.

Cast

 Hitomi Kuroki as Yoshimi Matsubara
 Yukiko Ikari as Young Yoshimi
 Rio Kanno as Ikuko Matsubara (6-year-old Ikuko)
 Asami Mizukawa as Ikuko Hamada (16-year-old Ikuko)
 Mirei Oguchi as Mitsuko Kawai
 Fumiyo Kohinata as Kunio Hamada
 Yu Tokui as Ohta (realtor)
 Isao Yatsu as Kamiya (manager)
 Shigemitsu Ogi as Kishida (Yoshimi's lawyer)
 Maiko Asano as Young Yoshimi's Teacher
 Shinji Nomura as Mediator (man)
 Kiriko Shimizu as Mediator (woman)
 Teruko Hanahara as Old Lady (twin, elder) / Old Woman A
 Youko Yasuda as Kono
 Tarou Suwa Old Lady (twin, younger) / Old Woman B
 Shichirou Gou as Nishioka (Kunio's lawyer)
 Sachiko Hara as Kayo (Yoshimi's aunt)
 Tohru Shinagawa as Principal

Release
The film was released theatrically in Japan on January 19, 2002, where it was distributed by Toho and received a total domestic gross of $906,344. In the Philippines, the film was released by Solar Films on July 30, 2003. The film grossed a total over $1.4 million worldwide.

The film was shown at the AFI Film Festival in the United States on November 9, 2002.

Home media
An American DVD release of Dark Water was dubbed in 2004 by ADV Films, and later released on June 21, 2005, by Section23. Arrow Video released Dark Water on Blu-Ray (AV068) on October 25, 2016. It was packaged with a 1080p transfer Blu-Ray disc and separate standard definition DVD disc.

Reception
On the review aggregator website Rotten Tomatoes, Dark Water has an approval rating of 81% (based on 16 critics). Peter Bradshaw of The Guardian gave the film 4 out of 5 stars, writing that "The movie's denouement delivers not just a flash of fear but a strange, sweet charge of pathos - and the combination adds up to the most disturbing spell in the cinema I've had in a very long time". Alexander Walker of the London Evening Standard also gave the film a positive review, writing that "Its cleverness relies on transferring our concern from the supernatural events emanating from one lost child to the natural fear of a mother losing her own child to the other world." Katie Rife of The A.V. Club recommended the film for horror fans, writing that "The J-horror boom of the '90s and early '00s produced some extremely creepy ghost stories, and Dark Water ... is one of the creepiest, and saddest, of them all."

Thomas Spurlin of DVD Talk gave the film 3.5 out of 5 stars, writing that it "doesn't pack as much of a suspenseful punch as other entries in the J-Horror subgenre, but the heaviness of its supernatural moisture-soaked atmosphere and the melancholy angle of its parental theatrics fill that void". Nicholas Rucka of Midnight Eye called the film "a simply passable horror viewing experience", criticizing its "weak story resolve and mediocre characterization" but writing that it "is worth watching for a good chill."

In 2020, Katherine McLaughlin included the film in a list of 10 great Japanese ghost stories, referring to the film as an "eerie and heartbreaking adaptation" that "strikes a disquieting mood".

Related works
The original title, Honogurai Mizu no Soko kara (仄暗い水の底から, From the Depths of Dark Water), is also the title of the horror anthology by Koji Suzuki and the manga adaptation, authored by Koji Suzuki and illustrated by MEIMU, under Kadokawa Shoten in 2002. The English manga version, translated by Javier Lopez, was published as Dark Water by ADV Manga in 2004.

An American remake of the film, directed by Walter Salles and starring Jennifer Connelly, was released on 8 July 2005.

See also

List of ghost films

References

Works cited

External links

2002 films
2000s psychological drama films
2000s supernatural horror films
2002 drama films
2002 horror films
Films about curses
Films based on short fiction
Films directed by Hideo Nakata
Films scored by Kenji Kawai
Films set in apartment buildings
Films set in Japan
Films set in the 2010s
Japan in fiction
Japanese ghost films
Japanese horror films
Japanese supernatural horror films
Toho films
2000s Japanese films

ja:仄暗い水の底から#映画『仄暗い水の底から』(2002)